The 2016 Hawke's Bay Cup was the 3rd edition of the invitational Hawke's Bay Cup competition. It took place between 2–10 April 2016 in Hastings,  New Zealand. A total of eight teams competed for the title.

New Zealand won the tournament for the first time after defeating Japan 3–2 in the final. Australia won the third place match by defeating China 3–1.

Teams
Including New Zealand, 8 teams were invited by the New Zealand Hockey Federation to participate in the tournament.

Results

First round

Pool A

Pool B

Second round

Quarter-finals

Fifth to eighth place classification

Crossover

Seventh and eighth place

Fifth and sixth place

First to fourth place classification

Semi-finals

Third and fourth place

Final

Statistics

Final standings

Goalscorers

References

External links

2016
2016 in women's field hockey
2016 in New Zealand women's sport
2016 in Irish women's sport
2016 in Australian women's field hockey
2016 in Chinese women's sport
2016 in South Korean women's sport
2016 in Japanese women's sport
2016 in Canadian women's sports
2016 in Indian women's sport